Acinetobacter brisouii is a gram-negative, strictly aerobic, non-spore-forming, nonmotile bacterium from the genus Acinetobacter isolated from a peat layer on Yongneup in South Korea.

References

External links
Type strain of Acinetobacter brisouii at BacDive -  the Bacterial Diversity Metadatabase

Moraxellaceae
Bacteria described in 2011